William Louis of Württemberg (7 January 1647 – 23 June 1677) was the ruler of the senior Duchy of Württemberg from 1674 until his death in 1677.

William Louis was born in Stuttgart, the ninth child of Eberhard III, Duke of Württemberg, and his first wife Anna Katharina of Kyrburg.

At the age of 30, the Duke died unexpectedly of a heart attack at the stop-over in Schloß Hirsau. His widow Magdalena Sibylla became regent of Württemberg between 1677 and 1693, until her son reached adulthood.

Issue
He married on 6 November 1673 in Darmstadt with Magdalena Sibylla of Hesse-Darmstadt, and had 4 children:
 Eleonore Dorothea (14 August 1674 – 26 May 1683).
 Eberhardine Luise (11 October 1675 – 26 March 1707).
 Eberhard Ludwig (19 September 1676 – 31 October 1733), next Duke of Württemberg.
 Magdalena Wilhelmine (7 November 1677 – 30 October 1742), married Charles III William, Margrave of Baden-Durlach.

Ancestors 

1647 births
1677 deaths
17th-century dukes of Württemberg
Nobility from Stuttgart
Hereditary Princes of Württemberg
Burials at Stiftskirche, Stuttgart